The Canton of Montauban-2 is one of the 15 cantons of the Tarn-et-Garonne department, in southern France. Since the French canton reorganisation which came into effect in March 2015, the canton covers the northeastern part of the commune of Montauban.

References

Montauban-2